Roger Magnusson (born 20 March 1945 in Mönsterås) is a Swedish former footballer who played as a right winger. He is a brother of fellow footballer Benno Magnusson.

He played for the Sweden national team and for various clubs in Europe, including a short spell at Juventus FC. His most successful years were at Olympique de Marseille, where he formed a duo with striker Josip Skoblar winning the Ligue 1 in 1971 and 1972 and the Coupe de France in 1972. In the 1972 Coupe de France Final, he delivered two assists.

He was known for his dribbling ability and nicknamed le Garrincha suédois (The Swedish Garrincha) in Marseille. But the arrival at the club of Salif Keita pushed him away from the pitch because French teams were compelled at the time to use only two foreign players, and Marseille's coaches used mainly Keita and Skoblar. However, he remains today one of the best players to have worn the l'OM jersey.

Honours
Marseille
 Coupe de France: in 1968–69, 1971–72
 Ligue 1: in 1970–71, 1971–72

References

External links
 
 Article and photos on a Olympique de Marseille fan site 

1945 births
Living people
People from Mönsterås Municipality
Sportspeople from Kalmar County
Swedish footballers
Association football wingers
Sweden international footballers
Ligue 1 players
Bundesliga players
Åtvidabergs FF players
1. FC Köln players
Juventus F.C. players
Olympique de Marseille players
Red Star F.C. players
Helsingborgs IF players
Swedish expatriate footballers
Swedish expatriate sportspeople in France
Expatriate footballers in France
Swedish expatriate sportspeople in Italy
Expatriate footballers in Italy
Swedish expatriate sportspeople in West Germany
Expatriate footballers in West Germany